A warmonger is someone who instigates war, or advocates war over peaceful solutions.

Warmonger may also refer to:
 Warmonger (novel), a 2002 novel based on the Doctor Who television series
 Warmonger: Operation Downtown Destruction, a 2007 first-person shooter computer game developed by NetDevil
 Warmonger, a villain from the cartoon series Mighty Max
 General Warmonger, a character from the 2009 animated film Monsters vs. Aliens
 A hero from the 2017 game For Honor

See also
 War hawk